Qujing North railway station is a railway station of Hangchangkun Passenger Railway located in Zhanyi district, Qujing, Yunnan, People's Republic of China.

References

Railway stations in Guizhou